Androniscus dentiger, the rosy woodlouse or pink woodlouse is a species of woodlouse found from the British Isles to North Africa.

Description
A. dentiger is a small woodlouse, at only 6 mm (¼ in) long, and is characteristically pink or orange in colour, with a yellow stripe along the midline of the dorsal surface, which divides in two towards the animal's tail. It has large eyes for its size and a granular exoskeleton.

Ecology
In the British Isles, A. dentiger is found in a wide variety of habitats, including coastal areas, gardens, old quarries and caves. It lives where there is a significant amount of lime available, and is reported to show a preference for Anglican churchyards over Catholic ones because the older, Protestant churches used ox-blood mortar.

In the south of its range, A. dentiger is primarily troglobitic, with populations in different cave systems being genetically isolated by the lack of migration between caves. Animals like A. dentiger which prefer to live in caves, but are not restricted to the cave environment may be termed troglophilic.

In North America, A. dentiger is only known to occur in greenhouses.

Subspecies
According to some authors, A. dentiger may be considered a complex of sibling species or cryptic species . Six subspecies are recognised:
Androniscus dentiger africanus Arcangeli, 1939
Androniscus dentiger caecus Brian, 1938
Androniscus dentiger calcivagus Verhoeff, 1908
Androniscus dentiger croaticus Strouhal, 1939
Androniscus dentiger dentiger Verhoeff, 1908
Androniscus dentiger ligulifer Verhoeff, 1908

See also
List of woodlice of the British Isles

References

Woodlice
Crustaceans described in 1908
Arthropods of Africa
Woodlice of Europe
Taxa named by Karl Wilhelm Verhoeff